David Charles Johnson (born February 20, 1947) is an American former competition swimmer.

Johnson represented the United States at the 1968 Summer Olympics in Mexico City.  He swam for the gold medal-winning U.S. relay teams in the preliminary heats of the men's 4×100-meter freestyle and men's 4×200-meter freestyle.  He did not receive a medal in either event because only relay swimmers who competed in the event final were eligible for medals under the 1968 Olympic rules.

Johnson attended Yale University, where he swam for coach Phil Moriarty's Yale Bulldogs swimming and diving team in National Collegiate Athletic Association (NCAA) and Ivy League competition from 1967 to 1969.  He was a member of the Yale team that won the NCAA national championship in the 800-yard freestyle relay in 1968.  He graduated from Yale College in 1969, and the Yale School of Medicine in 1973.

See also
 List of Yale University people

References

External links
 

1947 births
Living people
American male freestyle swimmers
Olympic swimmers of the United States
Sportspeople from Wilmington, Delaware
Swimmers at the 1968 Summer Olympics
Universiade medalists in swimming
Yale Bulldogs men's swimmers
Yale School of Medicine alumni
Universiade gold medalists for the United States
Medalists at the 1973 Summer Universiade